The UNC Asheville Bulldogs men's basketball team is the men's basketball team that represents the University of North Carolina at Asheville in Asheville, North Carolina, United States. Their current head coach is Mike Morrell. The school's team currently competes in the Big South Conference.

Postseason

NCAA tournament results
The Bulldogs have appeared in the NCAA tournament four times. Their combined record is 2–4.  Their highest seed is #15 in 2016 and 2023.

NIT results
The Bulldogs have appeared in the National Invitation Tournament (NIT) two times. Their combined record is 0–2.

CBI results
The Bulldogs have appeared in the College Basketball Invitational (CBI) one time. Their combined record is 1-1.

CIT results
The Bulldogs have appeared in the CollegeInsider.com Postseason Tournament (CIT) one time. Their record is 0–1.

NAIA Tournament results
The Bulldogs have appeared in the NAIA Tournament two times. Their combined record is 1–2.

References

External links
Team website